Bobe (Nori, Nouri) is a Skou language of Papua New Guinea. Genealogically close to Barupu, it has been strongly influenced by Womo.

References

Languages of Sandaun Province
Piore River languages